Svendborg Gymnasium & HF is one of the largest Upper Secondary Schools in Denmark with 1,000 students and 100 teachers. The school has two academically oriented general upper secondary programmes:
 the 3-year Upper Secondary School Leaving Examination (STX) and
 the 2-year Higher Preparatory Examination Course (HF)

Both programmes prepare pupils for further studies and, at the same time, they develop the pupils' personal and general competence. The programmes aim to enhance the pupils' independent and analytical skills as well as preparing them to become democratic and socially conscious citizens with a global outlook. The programmes comprise a wide range of both compulsory and optional subjects at different levels. The curriculum and examinations must follow national standards and are subject to external evaluation. Apart from subject-specific oral and written examinations, students must also prepare one or two major written assignments.

Admission requirements for STX are 9 years of basic school as well as certain subject requirements. For HF, admission requirements are 10 years of basic school or the equivalent thereof. STX is for those aged 16–19, whereas HF attracts both young people and adults.

History 
Svendborg Gymnasium was founded in 1872. The school was originally located in Bagergade, one of Svendborg’s oldest streets. To begin with the school offered an elementary programme with a school-leaving examination. In the 1909 the new Education Act was introduced, restructuring the educational system in Denmark. Hence the upper secondary school was founded and the first class from Svendborg Gymnasium graduated in 1912 with six students only.

Throughout the years the school's ownership changed from private to public and the ever-growing number of students result in the relocation of the school, twice. In 1932 the school was moved to a new building at Viebæltet and in the 1970s the school was relocated again to its present location at A.P. Møllersvej.

In 2006 a new extension was added and a new sports centre was built.

The school has had several different names throughout the years:

 Svendborg Realskole 1872–1912
 Svendborg Realskole og Gymnasium 1912–1920
 Svendborg Statsskole 1920–1932
 Svendborg Statsgymnasium 1932–1986
 Svendborg Gymnasium 1986–2007
 Svendborg Gymnasium & HF 2007 -

The School's Headmasters

List of Headmasters
 1872–1914: 	Johannes Moeller
 1914–1927:	Axel Mossin
 1927–1942: 	Dietrich Petersen
 1942–1952:	Karl Nielsen
 1952–1960:	Poul Kierkegaard
 1960–1979:	Ejnar Sneskov
 1979–2005:	Ole Visti Petersen
 2005-:	Jesper Vildbrad

The current headmaster Jesper Vildbrad graduated from the Universities of Odense and Copenhagen in History and Sports. He started his teaching career at Ollerup Idrætshøjskole, and later on at a nearby Svendborg Gymnasium. In 1997 he was appointed the headmaster of Tønder Gymnasium in Southern Jutland where he spent eight years before returning to Svendborg in 2005 and taking over after Ole Visti Petersen.

Intranet 

Svendborg Gymnasium uses a learning management system, Fronter, which enables the students and the teachers to communicate with each other. Furthermore, the system allows for the provision of online learning and online assessment. All students have access to a wireless connection from anywhere at school. In recent years an increasing number of students have brought their notebooks to school, thus allowing for a flexible learning environment. Students also get easy access to virtual tools such as dictionaries, article archives and online libraries.

The Sport Centre 
 Free sport activities: volleyball, basketball, handball, ultimate etc.

Ultimate is not very common in Denmark, but the students at Svendborg Gymnasium are very talented and might become a great ultimate-disc-team in Denmark. Svendborg Gymnasium has qualified for the next national cup for secondary schools.

The new sport centre, Gymnasiehallen, is also used for throwing the big annual dance party for all students and staff, The Lanciers. The entire school and parents participate in this yearly event.

Student Democracy 
The students are represented in all councils and committees set up by the school which deal with matters of interest to them. Also, they have representatives on the school board. Furthermore, each class is represented by two students in the students' council which has a meeting once a week. These meetings are led by the two presidents who are elected by the students themselves. In the student council everything that concerns the daily life at the school is discussed, and subsequently, students' proposals are brought forth in the relevant committees or to the headmaster.

BAENK 

BAENK is the school paper of Svendborg Gymnasium and is run by the students. The origin of BAENK is unknown.

Parties of Dusk 
Svendborg Gymnasium is known for its parties arranged be the committee DUSK. DUSK only contains students from Svendborg Gymnasium. The parties take place 5 times a year, often a time with a live band performance. The usual opening hours are from 20.00 to 01.00.

External links 
 Svendborg Gymnasium & HF
 School's Administration
 Svendborg Gymnasium & HF in local TV

Gymnasiums in Denmark
Buildings and structures in Svendborg Municipality
Svendborg